Benjamin Frith is a British classical pianist. He was born in South Yorkshire, England, on 11 October 1957. He began taking piano lessons with Fanny Waterman at age ten. He was encouraged by Waterman to pursue a career after winning the Dudley National Piano Competition in 1972, at age 14. Following Frith's Dudley win, Peter Pears asked him to play at the Aldeburgh Festival.

He was educated at the University of Leeds and graduated with a BA in Music in 1979.  Subsequently, he studied under Fanny Waterman and won several awards early in his career, including the Gold Medal at the 1989 Arthur Rubinstein Piano Competition in Israel. He has appeared with many of the world’s finest orchestras including the Berlin Symphony, Israel Philharmonic, City of Birmingham Symphony, Polish National Radio, and the BBC Philharmonic. He has worked with many leading conductors such as Zubin Mehta, Antoni Wit, Vasary, Skrowaczewski, Bamert, Atzman and Barry Wordsworth.

His repertoire ranges from Bach to Tippett and includes over 50 concertos. He has recorded all the John Field piano concertos (during 2002, numbers 5 & 6 reached the top of the classical charts) and since then has recorded all of Field’s nocturnes for solo piano. His disc of Schumann’s Davidsbündlertänze was chosen as the top recommendation on the Radio 3 “Building a Library” programme. Five of his discs are represented in the Gramophone – Best CD Guide and in response to his recording of the Beethoven Diabelli Variations, Gramophone critic Richard Osborne wrote, “he possesses a formidable talent both musically and technically. Indeed, I would go as far as to suggest that there has not been a finer Diabelli on record by a young pianist since the classic recording by the twenty eight year old Stephen Kovacevich in 1968”. A recent recording of a selection of Scarlatti Sonatas was described in the BBC Music Magazine as follows: “Benjamin Frith is an inspired choice for the fifth disc of the Naxos cycle; a compelling advocate of the piano, he transports the music to the new medium, capitalising on the piano’s ability to pick out a strand, shape dynamics and bathe textures in subtle pedalling, without ever misrepresenting Scarlatti – a disc to convert the most die-hard authenticist”.

He is a member of the Gould Piano Trio and is a tutor at the Royal Northern College of Music in Manchester.

References

External links
 Artist biography at Naxos

1957 births
British classical pianists
Male classical pianists
Living people
People from South Yorkshire
Prize-winners of the Ferruccio Busoni International Piano Competition
21st-century classical pianists
Musicians from Yorkshire
21st-century British male musicians